Paraschistura alta is a species of ray-finned fish in the genus Paraschistura from the Helmand River in Afghanistan.

References

alta
Fish described in 1998
Taxa named by Teodor T. Nalbant